On 27 September 2021, an Israeli  was spotted intruding Algerian territorial waters while attempting to track a training launch of a cruise missile from a submarine of Project 363.

This incident took place during preparations for the Radaa 2021 exercise. An Algerian  successfully detected the Israeli Dolphin-class submarine by acoustic means, and the decision was made to pursue it aggressively. The  deployed two Superlynx anti-submarine warfare helicopters to detect the Israeli submarine with optical means and magnetic detectors while the two Kilo-class submarines pushed the Israeli intruders back to the north. It was forced to surface to show a neutral posture to avoid destruction by the Algerian submarines and then leave. The Israeli crew surfaced "to indicate that they were abandoning the mission and moving away from the Algerian coast".

It has been confirmed on 2 October 2021 that the objectives of the Israeli submarine were to collect intelligence and technical information about the new Algerian submarine. It has been indicated that the Israeli submarine might have been aiming to gather intelligence information about the launch, range, and impact of the Kalibr missiles by an Algerian submarine. It is also widely believed that Israeli spying on the Algerian army and navy is part of the hostility between the two parties as part of the Arab–Israeli conflict, there are no relations between Algeria and Israel because Algeria strongly supports the Palestinian cause and rejects Arab–Israeli normalization. Algeria suspected Israel of supporting the Kabyle separatist Movement for the self-determination of Kabylia and taking part in the 2021 Algeria wildfires in Kabylia.

References 

2021 in Algeria
Algeria–Israel relations
Israeli Navy
Conflicts in 2021
International maritime incidents